Refuge area may refer to:
 Area of refuge, an emergency shelter area.
 Pesticide refuge area, a technique in agriculture.
 Refugee camp